Baron Max Wladimir von Beck (6 September 1854, in Vienna – 20 January 1943, in Vienna) was an Austrian statesman.

Baron Max Wladimir von Beck was selected as the main motif of an Austrian collectors' coin, the 100 Years of Universal Male Suffrage commemorative coin, minted on January 10, 2007. The coin design is based on a historic photo of the opening session of Parliament in 1907, right after the elections. These were the first Austrian elections held under universal male suffrage, after an electoral reform abolishing tax paying requirements for voters had been adopted by the Council and was endorsed by Emperor Franz Joseph earlier in the year.

References

1854 births
1943 deaths
20th-century Ministers-President of Austria
Barons of Austria
Politicians from Vienna
Ministers-President of Austria
University of Vienna alumni
Members of the House of Lords (Austria)